Supervision is an act or instance of directing, managing, or oversight.

Etymology 
The English noun "supervision" derives from the two Latin words "super" (above) and "videre" (see, observe).

Spelling

The spelling is "Supervision" in Standard English of all English linguistic varieties, including North American English.

Definitions
Supervision is the act or function of overseeing something or somebody.

A person who performs supervision is a "supervisor", but does not always have the formal title of supervisor. A person who is getting supervision is the "supervisee".

Theoretical scope
Generally, supervision contains elements of providing knowledge, helping to organize tasks, enhance motivation, and monitoring activity and results; the amount of each element is varying in different contexts.

Nature of supervision

Academia
In academia, supervision is aiding and guiding of a postgraduate research student, graduate student, or undergraduate student, in their research project; offering both moral support and scientific insight and guidance. The supervisor is often a senior scientist or scholar, and in some countries called doctoral advisor.

Business
In business, supervision is overseeing the work of staff. The person performing supervision could lack a formal title or carry the title supervisor or manager, where the latter has wider authority.

Counseling
In clinical supervision, the psychologist or psychiatrist has talk sessions with another professional in the field to debrief and mentally process the patient work.

Society
In society, supervision could be performed by the state or corporate entities to monitor and control its citizens. Public entities often do supervision of different activities in the nation, such as bank supervision.

See also
 Clinical supervision
 Management
 Supervisor

References

Management